Persatuan Sepakbola Indonesia Prabumulih (simply known as Persipra Prabumulih) is an Indonesian football club based in Prabumulih, South Sumatra. They currently compete in the Liga 3.

Honours 
Liga 3 South Sumatra zone
Third-place : 2021

References

External links
 

Football clubs in Indonesia
Football clubs in South Sumatra
Association football clubs established in 2002
2002 establishments in Indonesia